Helgi Tómasson may refer to:

Helgi Tómasson (dancer) (born 1942), Icelandic ballet dancer and choreographer
Helgi Tómasson (physician) (1896–1958), Icelandic physician